Nikolai Aleksandrovich Prudnikov (born 1 January 1998) is a Russian football player. He plays for Hungarian club Mezőkövesd.

Club career
He made his debut in the Russian Professional Football League for Chertanovo Moscow on 10 April 2016 in a game against Zenit Penza and scored the only goal of the game, giving his team a 1-0 win.

He made his Russian Football National League debut for Zenit-2 St. Petersburg on 8 July 2017 in a game against Shinnik Yaroslavl.

On 11 February 2019, he returned to Chertanovo Moscow on loan until the end of the 2018–19 season.

On 4 January 2023, Prudnikov signed with Mezőkövesd in Hungary.

International
He represented Russia national under-17 football team at the 2015 FIFA U-17 World Cup.

Honours
 Russian Professional Football League Zone Center top scorer: 2016–17.

References

External links
 

1998 births
People from Shklow
Living people
Russian footballers
Association football forwards
Russia youth international footballers
FC Zenit-2 Saint Petersburg players
FC Chertanovo Moscow players
FC Orenburg players
Mezőkövesdi SE footballers
Russian First League players
Russian Second League players
Russian expatriate footballers
Expatriate footballers in Hungary
Russian expatriate sportspeople in Hungary